Beryanak (also Romanized as Beryānak and Berīānak) is a village in Mohammadabad Rural District, in the Central District of Marvdasht County, Fars Province, Iran. At the 2006 census, its population was 263, in 62 families.

References 

Populated places in Marvdasht County